The 32nd New Brunswick Legislative Assembly represented New Brunswick between April 30, 1908, and May 25, 1912.

Lemuel John Tweedie served as Lieutenant-Governor of New Brunswick.

D. Morrison was chosen as speaker in 1908. G.J. Clarke became speaker in 1909 after Morrison resigned.

The Conservative Party led by John Douglas Hazen formed the government for the first time since 1883. James Kidd Flemming became party leader in 1911 when Hazen entered federal politics.

History

Members 

Notes:

References 
 Canadian Parliamentary Guide, 1912, EJ Chambers

Terms of the New Brunswick Legislature
1908 establishments in New Brunswick
1912 disestablishments in New Brunswick
20th century in New Brunswick